The Incredible Invasion (Invasion siniestra/ The Sinister Invasion), also known as Alien Terror, is a 1968 Mexican science fiction film directed by Luis Enrique Vergara. It stars Boris Karloff, Yerye Beirute and Enrique Guzmán. It is the last film Karloff worked on before his death in 1969. It was filmed in May 1968, but was only released theatrically in 1971, 2 years after Karloff had died.

Incredible Invasion is one of four low-budget Mexican horror films Karloff made in a package deal with Mexican producer Luis Enrique Vergara. The others are Isle of the Snake People, Fear Chamber, and House of Evil. Karloff's scenes for all four films were directed by Jack Hill in Los Angeles in the spring of 1968. The films were then completed in Mexico.

Plot synopsis
Gudenberg, 1890: Professor John Mayer has invented a ray gun which runs on nuclear power. During testing, a ray is shot into space and attracts the attention of a flying saucer. The aliens decide to come to Earth to destroy the weapon...

Cast
Boris Karloff as Prof. John Mayer
Enrique Guzmán as Dr. Paul Rosten
Christa Linder as Laura
Maura Monti as Dr. Isabel Reed
Yerye Beirute as Thomas
Tere Valez as Nancy
Sergio Kleiner as Alien
Tito Novaro as Gen. Nord

Production
Karloff's advanced age was noticeable on the film; regarding his health status, Michael J. Weldon in The Encyclopedia of Film noted, "The ill, 81-year-old horror star is always shown sitting down or leaning against a support of some kind."

Reception 
AllMovie's synopsis of the film states, "The filmmakers barely had enough talent to adhere to the simplest of storylines, much less this hodgepodge of cut-rate H. G. Wells posturing and sleazy exploitation." James O'Neil in Terror on Tape called The Incredible Invasion "one of the four awful low-budget U.S.-Mexican co-productions the great actor [Boris Karloff] filmed a few months prior to his death in 1969." Michael R. Pitts in Columbia Pictures Horror, Science Fiction and Fantasy Films, 1928–1982 said that "While Karloff is quite good as the scientist and Christa Linder is strikingly beautiful as his niece, the overall production is labored", and that "[w]hile not as bad as Fear Chamber or House of Evil, The Incredible Invasion must rank as one of Karloff's worst cinema outings."

See also
 List of Mexican films of 1971
 Boris Karloff filmography

References

External links

Alien invasions in films
Mexican science fiction horror films
English-language Mexican films
1970s science fiction horror films
1971 horror films
1971 films
Films directed by Jack Hill
Columbia Pictures films
1970s English-language films
1970s Mexican films